The Separate Baptists were an 18th-century group of Baptists in the United States, primarily in the South, that grew out of the Great Awakening.

The Great Awakening was a religious revival and revitalization of piety among the Christian churches. It covered English-speaking countries and swept through the American colonies between the 1730s and the 1770s. Three important preachers of the times were Gilbert Tennent (1703–65), Jonathan Edwards (1703–58), and George Whitefield (1714–70). The Separate Baptists are most directly connected to Whitefield's influence. The first identifiable congregation of Separate Baptists was formed in Boston, Massachusetts. Whitefield preached in Boston in 1740. The pastor of the Baptist church disapproved of the revival excitement, while several members approved of it and became discontented with the pastor's ministry. They withdrew from the First Baptist Church and formed Second Baptist Church in 1743.

The Great Awakening served to both invigorate and divide churches. Many denominations divided into Old Lights — holding a low view of the revivalism, and sometimes directly opposing it — and New Lights — who enthusiastically embraced it. Many New Lights felt that the old ways had allowed too many unconverted church members, and by the end of the 1740s some of the New Lights believed the established churches could not be reformed from within and withdrew from them. A favorite verse among them was II Corinthians 6:17 — "Come out from among them, and be ye separate." This led to them being called Separate.

A growing body of Separate Baptists began in New England. They were zealous in evangelism and held to heart-felt religion. The most prominent New England pastor and congregation was Isaac Backus (1724–1808) and the church at Middleborough, Massachusetts. Backus was raised a Congregationalist and became a New Light (or Separatist) Congregational pastor in 1748. After conversion to Baptist views on the doctrine of baptism, Backus and others formed a Baptist congregation in 1756. Backus was very active in the fight for religious liberty in America. The Separate Baptists of New England were never truly a separate group from the Regular Baptists. It would remain for the Separate Baptists in the South to develop along distinct lines.

In 1745 Shubal Stearns (1706–71), a member of the Congregational church in Tolland, Connecticut, heard evangelist George Whitefield. Stearns was converted and adopted the Awakening's view of revival and conversion. Stearns' church became involved in a controversy over the proper subjects of baptism in 1751. Soon Stearns rejected infant baptism and sought baptism at the hands of Wait Palmer, Baptist minister of Stonington, Connecticut. By March, Shubal Stearns was ordained into the ministry by Palmer and Joshua Morse, the pastor of New London, Connecticut. The next twenty years of Stearns' remarkable ministry is inextricably intertwined with the rise and expansion of the Separate Baptists.

In 1754, Stearns moved south to Opequon, Virginia. Here he joined Daniel Marshall and wife Martha (Stearns' sister), who were already active in a Baptist church there. On November 22, 1755, Stearns and his party moved further south to Sandy Creek, in Guilford County, North Carolina. This party consisted of eight men and their wives, mostly relatives of Stearns. Stearns pastored at Sandy Creek until his death. From there, Separate Baptists spread in the South. The church quickly grew from 16 members to 606. Church members moved to other areas and started other churches. The Sandy Creek Association was formed in 1758. Morgan Edwards, Baptist minister and historian contemporary with Stearns, recorded that, "in 17 years, [Sandy Creek] has spread its branches westward as far as the great river Mississippi; southward as far as Georgia; eastward to the sea and Chesopeck [sic] Bay; and northward to the waters of the Pottowmack [sic]; it, in 17 years, is become mother, grandmother, and great grandmother to 42 churches, from which sprang 125 ministers."

For a time these Baptists remained somewhat distinct from the Regular Baptists. They were in the main in agreement with the Regulars, but holding to some minor points of difference. According to Edwards, "These are called Separates, not because they withdrew from the Regular-baptists but because they have hitherto declined any union with them. The faith and order of both are the same, except some trivial matters not sufficient to support a distinction, but less a disunion; for both avow the Century-Confession and the annexed discipline."

One distinction was in the number of ordinances or rites observed by the Separates. The nine rites were baptism, the Lord's supper, love feasts, laying on of hands, washing feet, anointing the sick, the right hand of fellowship, kiss of charity, and devoting children. Not all the churches practiced all nine of these, but most churches practiced more than the two ordinances generally held by the Regular Baptists — baptism and the Lord's supper.

With the exception of the Separate Baptists in Christ, the denominational name Separate Baptist disappeared in many areas of the country with the formal and informal agreements of union between the Regular Baptists and Separate Baptists, beginning in Virginia in 1787, in the Carolinas in 1789, and in Kentucky in 1797 & 1801. As recorded by Benedict, the conclusion of the terms of union in Virginia stated, "...we are united, and desire hereafter, that the names Regular and Separate be buried in oblivion; and that from henceforth, we shall be known by the name of the United Baptist Churches, in Virginia."

Descendants of the Separate Baptists include the Separate Baptists in Christ, Landmark Missionary Baptists, Primitive Baptists, Southern Baptists, United Baptists, and The General Association of Baptists.

Separate Baptists are particularly visible in Kentucky, where a member of the denomination, Vernie McGaha of Russell Springs, served in the state senate.

References
 .
 .
 .
 .
 .

Baptist denominations in North America
Former Christian denominations